The AWA America's Championship was a very short-lived title in the American Wrestling Association that was created to play upon Sgt. Slaughter's patriotism. It lasted for shortly over one year, from 1985 until 1986.

Title history

See also
American Wrestling Association

References

American Wrestling Association championships